Heteroonops is a genus of spiders in the family Oonopidae. It was first described in 1916 by Dalmas. , it contains about 25 species.

Species
, the World Spider Catalog accepts the following species:

Heteroonops andros Platnick & Dupérré, 2009 – Bahamas
Heteroonops aylinalegreae Dupérré, 2020 – Dominican Republic
Heteroonops carlosviquezi Dupérré, 2020 – Dominican Republic
Heteroonops castelloides Platnick & Dupérré, 2009 – Dominican Republic
Heteroonops castellus (Chickering, 1971) – Puerto Rico, US Virgin Islands
Heteroonops colombi Dumitrescu & Georgescu, 1983 – Cuba
Heteroonops constanza Dupérré, 2020 – Dominican Republic
Heteroonops croix Platnick & Dupérré, 2009 – US Virgin Islands
Heteroonops gabrielsantosi Dupérré, 2020 – Dominican Republic
Heteroonops iviei Platnick & Dupérré, 2009 – Dominican Republic
Heteroonops jurassicus Dupérré, 2020 – Dominican Republic
Heteroonops macaque Platnick & Dupérré, 2009 – Dominican Republic
Heteroonops murphyorum Platnick & Dupérré, 2009 – Costa Rica
Heteroonops renebarbai Dupérré, 2020 – Dominican Republic
Heteroonops saba Platnick & Dupérré, 2009 – Caribbean Netherlands (Saba), Montserrat
Heteroonops scapula Dupérré, 2020 – Dominican Republic
Heteroonops singulus (Gertsch & Davis, 1942) – Mexico
Heteroonops solanllycarreroae Dupérré, 2020 – Dominican Republic
Heteroonops spinigata Platnick & Dupérré, 2009 – Jamaica
Heteroonops spinimanus (Simon, 1892) (type species) – North to South America, Caribbean; introduced to Macaronesia, Netherlands, Germany, Czechia, Seychelles, Madagascar, Australia, Pacific Islands
Heteroonops toro Platnick & Dupérré, 2009 – Puerto Rico
Heteroonops validus (Bryant, 1948) – Dominican Republic
Heteroonops vega Platnick & Dupérré, 2009 – Dominican Republic
Heteroonops verruca Dupérré, 2020 – Dominican Republic
Heteroonops yuma Dupérré, 2020 – Dominican Republic

References

Oonopidae
Araneomorphae genera
Spiders of Mexico
Spiders of the Caribbean
Pantropical spiders